Francis Angelo Negri (1 November 1917 – 8 August 1994) was an Australian rules footballer who played with Collingwood in the Victorian Football League (VFL).

Family
The son of Angelo Monigatti Negri (1880-1940), and Adelaide Negri (1892-1944), née Tiernan, Francis Angelo Negri was born on 1 November 1917.

His younger brother, Des Negri, also played VFL football for Collingwood.

War Service & Football

Negri served in the Australian Army from 1942 to 1947, spending 12 months at Duntroon Military College and being commissioned as an officer in 1943. He played six games for Collingwood during his period of war service, and at the end of 1945 was working in the Records Office.

Country Umpire
Negri later became an umpire in Victorian country leagues.

Notes

External links 

Profile on Collingwood Forever

1917 births
1994 deaths
Australian rules footballers from Melbourne
Collingwood Football Club players
Australian Army personnel of World War II
People from Malvern, Victoria
Military personnel from Melbourne